A heat diffuser is a cooking utensil that is placed on top of a ring on a cooktop in order to separate the pan/pot from the direct source of heat.

Food preparation utensils